Jozef "Jos" Heyligen (born 30 June 1947) is a retired Belgian footballer.

Career
During his career he played for Royal Antwerp F.C., K. Beringen F.C., and K.V.C. Westerlo. He earned 2 caps for the Belgium national football team, and participated in UEFA Euro 1980.

He was also the manager of K.R.C. Genk from 1999 to 2000.

Honours

Player

Beerschot 

 Belgian Cup: 1970–71

FC Antwerp 

 Belgian Cup: 1974–75 (finalists)

Thor Waterschei 

 Belgian Second Division: 1977–78

International 
Belgium

 UEFA European Championship: 1980 (runners-up)
 Belgian Sports Merit Award: 1980

Individual 

 Man of the Season (Belgian First Division): 1970–71

Manager

Racing Genk 

 Belgian Cup: 1999–2000

References

External links

Profile - FC Antwerp

1947 births
Living people
Belgian footballers
Belgium international footballers
UEFA Euro 1980 players
K. Beerschot V.A.C. players
Royal Antwerp F.C. players
K. Waterschei S.V. Thor Genk players
K. Beringen F.C. players
K.F.C. Winterslag players
K.V.C. Westerlo players
Belgian Pro League players
K.V.C. Westerlo managers
Belgian football managers
Association football midfielders
K.F.C. Diest players